Delta Sigma Theta Sorority, Inc. is an international organization of college-educated women.  Originally established for women of color, Delta Sigma Theta now has membership that includes women of all races.  Delta Sigma Theta is the largest single organization historically founded for and by Black Women in the United States.  Founded on January 13, 1913 at Howard University by twenty-two visionary collegiate students, Delta Sigma Theta is the first African American Greek lettered organization for women founded on the principles of servings others and political activity.  Delta Sigma Theta held its first national convention in 1919 in Washington, D.C.  The national body of Delta Sigma Theta previously met annually, but due to a number of factors, the main of which is the establishment of regions and regional leadership, the National body currently meets at biennial [every two years] conventions, and regional conferences are held for each individual region in the years in which conventions are not held.  This list of Delta Sigma Theta National Conventions includes dates on which the conventions were held, host cities, and general themes and major accomplishments of each convention.

References

Delta Sigma Theta
Conventions